Gangatiri (Hindi: गंगातिरी) is an indigenous cattle breed of India. It is known to be originated in the region along the banks of Ganga river in eastern Uttar Pradesh and western parts of Bihar state. It is an important dual purpose breed of North India and are fairly good milk yielders.

See also
List of breeds of cattle

References 

Cattle breeds originating in India
Cattle breeds
Animal husbandry in Uttar Pradesh